Floyd Township is a township in O'Brien County, Iowa, USA.

History
Floyd Township was established in 1872. It was named for the explorer Charles Floyd.

References

Townships in O'Brien County, Iowa
Townships in Iowa